Mistletoe State Park is a 1,972 acre (7.98 km²) Georgia state park located northwest of Augusta, Georgia on the southern shore of Lake Strom Thurmond.  The park gets its name from Mistletoe Corners, a local area where people gather to pick mistletoe during the winter holiday season.  Its strategic location on the lake makes it one of the finest bass fishing spots in the nation.  The park also offers public beaches and 8 miles of nature trails. The land on which the park is located is leased to Georgia by the United States Army Corps of Engineers.

Facilities
84 Tent/Trailer/RV Sites
10 Cottages
1 Fisherman's Cabin
1 Tent Cabin
1 Beachhouse
Sand Beach
3 Boat Ramps
4 Walk-In Campsites
1 Pioneer Campground
5 Picnic Shelters
1 Group Shelter
3 Backcountry Campsites

References

External links
Mistletoe State Park
U.S. Geological Survey Map at the U.S. Geological Survey Map Website. Retrieved January 9th, 2023.

State parks of Georgia (U.S. state)
Protected areas of Columbia County, Georgia